The 1994 Hanes 500 was the eighth stock car race of the 1994 NASCAR Winston Cup Series season and the 45th iteration of the event. The race was held on Sunday, April 24, 1994, in Martinsville, Virginia at Martinsville Speedway, a  permanent oval-shaped short track. The race took the scheduled 500 laps to complete. In the final laps of the race, Penske Racing South driver Rusty Wallace would be able to defend Robert Yates Racing driver Ernie Irvan to complete a comeback from a speeding penalty midway through the race, retaking the lead on lap 433. The race was Wallace's 33rd career NASCAR Winston Cup Series victory and his second victory of the season. To fill out the top three, the aforementioned Ernie Irvan and Roush Racing driver Mark Martin would finish second and third, respectively. With his second-place finish, Irvan was able to regain the overall points lead in the driver's championship from Dale Earnhardt.

Background 

Martinsville Speedway is an NASCAR-owned stock car racing track located in Henry County, in Ridgeway, Virginia, just to the south of Martinsville. At 0.526 miles (0.847 km) in length, it is the shortest track in the NASCAR Cup Series. The track was also one of the first paved oval tracks in NASCAR, being built in 1947 by H. Clay Earles. It is also the only remaining race track that has been on the NASCAR circuit from its beginning in 1948.

Entry list 

 (R) denotes rookie driver.

Qualifying 
Qualifying was split into two rounds. The first round was held on Friday, April 22, at 3:00 PM EST. Each driver would have one lap to set a time. During the first round, the top 20 drivers in the round would be guaranteed a starting spot in the race. If a driver was not able to guarantee a spot in the first round, they had the option to scrub their time from the first round and try and run a faster lap time in a second round qualifying run, held on Saturday, April 23, at 12:30 PM EST. As with the first round, each driver would have one lap to set a time. For this specific race, positions 21-34 would be decided on time, and depending on who needed it, a select amount of positions were given to cars who had not otherwise qualified but were high enough in owner's points; which was usually two.  If needed, a past champion who did not qualify on either time or provisionals could use a champion's provisional, adding one more spot to the field.

Eight drivers would fail to qualify.

Full qualifying results

Race results

Standings after the race 

Drivers' Championship standings

Note: Only the first 10 positions are included for the driver standings.

References 

1994 NASCAR Winston Cup Series
NASCAR races at Martinsville Speedway
April 1994 sports events in the United States
1994 in sports in Virginia